Spain competed at the 2011 World Aquatics Championships in Shanghai, China between July 16 and 31, 2011.

Medalists

Diving

Spain has qualified 3 athletes in diving.

Men

Women

Open water swimming

Men

Women

Swimming

Spain qualified 10 swimmers.

Men

Women

Synchronised swimming

Spain has qualified 10 athletes in synchronised swimming.

Women

Water polo

Men

Team Roster 

Inaki Morillo
Mario Rodriguez
Eric Marti
Francisco Fernandez
Guillermo Rios – Captain
Marc Alferez
Marc Barcelo
Albert Lifante
Xavier Trias
Felipe Rocha
Ivan Vargas
Javier Gadea
Daniel Pinedo

Group A

Playoff round

Quarterfinals

Classification 5–8

Fifth place game

Women

Team Roster

Ana Maria Copado Amoros
Blanca Gil Sorli
Anna Espar Llaquet
Helena Lloret Gomez
Matilde Ortiz Reyes
Paula Chillida
Lorena Miranda Dorado
Maria Del Pilar Pena Carrasco
Andrea Blas Martinez
Ona Meseguer Flaque
Maria Del Carmen Garcia Godoy
Marta Bach Pascual
Laura Ester Ramos

Group C

Playoff round

Classification 9–12

Eleventh place game

References

Nations at the 2011 World Aquatics Championships
2011 in Spanish sport
Spain at the World Aquatics Championships